Vlad Grecu (born 1959) is a Moldovan writer.

Early life
Grecu was born in Dubăsari, Moldova. He graduated from the Schools of Plastic Arts of Chișinău (1976) and the Technical University - Civil and Industrial Constructions Faculty (1987).

Life
During the 1992 War of Transnistria, Grecu wrote leaflets for the Moldovan forces fighting against Transnistria. After the war he is living in Chişinău.

Books
O viziune din focarul conflictului de la Dubăsari (A view from the centre of the Dubăsari conflict) (2005). A memoir of the political conflict in Transnistria.
Morcovel (2002), a children's book.
Unde-s zeii popoarelor învinse (2010).
Somn letargic (2017).
Fabrica de genii (2018).
Firingina (2021).

THEATER
Do Major cu Paula (2015.
Beciul (2016).
Merele edenice sau nora de la Cluj (2018).

References

1959 births
Living people
People from Dubăsari
Moldovan writers
Moldovan male writers